Albert Pierce Taylor (December 18, 1872 – January 12, 1931) was an American archivist, journalist and historian of the Territory of Hawaii. He served as the  Librarian of the Archives of Hawaii from 1924 until his death.

Life and career
Born December 18, 1872, in St. Louis, Missouri, Taylor was the son of George A. Taylor, a Canadian from Nova Scotia, and Melissa Pierce Taylor, whose family was from Illinois and Virginia. He was educated in Leadville, Colorado and graduated in 1890–91 from St. Mark's School in Salt Lake City. He initially worked for the Union Pacific Railroad surveying the route from Salt Lake City to Los Angeles. In 1896, he became as a clerk and later assistant secretary for the Silver Party Party Convention in St. Louis. He went to Washington, DC to manage with the party's headquarter and help with the 1896 presidential campaign of William Jennings Bryan. Promise of a consulship by the party leaders evaporated when Bryan loss to William McKinley. Taylor decided to join the Cuban War of Independence on the side of the rebels but was arrested, imprisoned and deported to New York by the Spanish colonial authorities. He returned to Washington, DC, where he worked in a patent law office. Around this period, he became acquainted with Hawaiian annexationist Lorrin A. Thurston. He worked as a secretary for Thurston while in Washington and later moved to Honolulu on August 28, 1898, shortly after the American annexation of Hawaii.

Taylor initially worked as a secretary to Walter F. Frear, a Hawaii Supreme Court justice and member of the board of commissioners responsible for drafting the Hawaiian Organic Act. He later worked as deputy clerk to the Hawaii Supreme Court. During the Spanish–American War, he enlisted and fought in the Philippines. After the war, he returned to Honolulu and joined the staff of The Pacific Commercial Advertiser working on and off from 1899 to 1907, 1908 to 1913 and from 1917 to 1924. In between these years, he worked as chief of detectives of Honolulu in 1907 and promotional official for the Territory of Hawaii. He worked as secretary of the Hawaiian Fair Commission to the Panama–Pacific International Exposition from 1913 to 1915 when he was appointed secretary of the Hawaiian Promotion Committee. On December 1, 1924, he was appointed Librarian of the Archives of Hawaii which he held until his death. He was also a member of the member of the Cook Sesquicentennial Commission from 1927 to 1931.

Taylor wrote Fighting a Typhoon, a magazine about his service in the Philippines, and  Under Hawaiian Skies, a history of Hawaii. He also contributed numerous papers and articles for the Hawaiian Historical Society and the Paradise of the Pacific magazine. In later life, he served as a Trustee of the Hawaiian Historical Society and was its Recording and Corresponding Secretary until his death. Taylor died on January 12, 1931, and was buried at the Oahu Cemetery.

Personal life
Taylor and his first wife Ella De Mund, from Elkhart, Indiana, were married in 1896 in Baltimore. They had one daughter who married Wesley Peck and resided in California. On November 5, 1902, he married his second wife Emma Ahuena Davison at her mother Mary Jane Kekulani Fayerweather Davison Montano's residence in the Mānoa Valley. Descended from Hawaiian nobility and the Beckley family, both Emma and her mother were authorities on Hawaiian history, culture and language and provided important influences on Taylor's own historical work. They had no children.

Works

References

Bibliography

1872 births
1931 deaths
Writers from St. Louis
People from Leadville, Colorado
People from Salt Lake City
Utah Silverites
People from Honolulu
Historians of Hawaii
American military personnel of the Spanish–American War
Military personnel from Missouri
Territory of Hawaii officials
Burials at Oahu Cemetery
Editors of Hawaii newspapers